The 2017 Northern Ireland Assembly election was held on Thursday, 2 March 2017. The election was held to elect members (MLAs) following the resignation of deputy First Minister Martin McGuinness in protest over the Renewable Heat Incentive scandal. McGuinness' position was not filled, and thus by law his resignation triggered an election.

Eight parties elected MLAs in the sixth assembly: the Democratic Unionist Party (DUP), Sinn Féin, the Ulster Unionist Party (UUP), the Social Democratic and Labour Party (SDLP), the Alliance Party of Northern Ireland, the Greens, People Before Profit (PBP), and Traditional Unionist Voice (TUV). There was also one Independent Unionist MLA.

It was the sixth election since the Assembly was re-established in 1998, and the first to implement a reduction in size to 90 MLAs (versus the previous 108).

1,254,709 people were registered to vote in the election (26,886 fewer, or a 2.1% decrease, compared to the 2016 Assembly election). 64.78% of registered voters turned out to vote in the 2017 Assembly election, up 9.8 percentage points from the previous Assembly election held in 2016, but 5 percentage points less than in the first election to the Assembly held in 1998.

Background
Theresa Villiers, Secretary of State for Northern Ireland, announced in 2013 that the next Assembly election would be postponed to May 2016, and would be held at fixed intervals of five years thereafter. Section 7 of the Northern Ireland (Miscellaneous Provisions) Act 2014 specifies that elections will be held on the first Thursday in May in the fifth calendar year following that in which its predecessor was elected, which after 2016 was to be 6 May 2021. However, by virtue of section 31(1) of the Northern Ireland Act 1998, there are several circumstances in which the Assembly can be dissolved before the date scheduled.

Martin McGuinness (Sinn Féin), the deputy First Minister, resigned on 9 January 2017 in protest at the Renewable Heat Incentive scandal (RHI) and other issues, such as the DUP's failure to support funding for inquests into killings during The Troubles and for an Irish language project. The First Minister, Arlene Foster (DUP), had been in charge of the RHI scheme in her previous ministerial position, but had refused to temporarily stand down as First Minister while an enquiry took place. Under the power-sharing arrangement, McGuinness' resignation as deputy First Minister meant that Foster automatically lost office as First Minister. The DUP condemned his resignation.

Sinn Féin had seven days, until 5 pm on 16 January 2017, in which to nominate a new deputy First Minister, but refused to do so in the Assembly plenary on 16 January. As a result, the Secretary of State for Northern Ireland, James Brokenshire, confirmed the same day that a snap election would be held on 2 March.

McGuinness subsequently announced that, owing to ill-health, he would not be seeking re-election to the Assembly; he then stepped down from leading the Sinn Féin group. He was replaced by Michelle O'Neill as leader of Sinn Féin in the Northern Ireland Assembly. Nineteen days after the election, McGuinness died.

Candidates
Nominations opened on 27 January 2017 for the assembly election and closed on 8 February 2017.

A total of 228 candidates contested the 90 available seats in the Assembly, a reduction from the 276 who contested the 108 seats available in 2016. The seats were spread over 18 districts, with each district having five seats. The election was conducted using the single transferable vote system.

The table below lists all of the nominated candidates. Candidates for the same party in a constituency are listed in alphabetical order, which is the order they appeared on the ballot paper.

Gerry Mullan, who was an MLA for the SDLP before the dissolution, stood as an independent after having been deselected by the party. Jonathan Bell, who was suspended from the DUP, was also standing as an independent. Both failed to get elected.

Members not seeking re-election

Campaign
The Renewable Heat Incentive scandal remained central in the campaign. Sinn Féin said they would not return to government with the DUP while questions over RHI remain over the DUP's leader, Foster. There were concerns about deteriorating cross-community relationships. If the two parties emerged as the largest in their communities and could not resolve the issue, direct rule by the UK government could be imposed.

The UUP leader, Mike Nesbitt, promoted the possibility of a UUP/SDLP administration. He said he would give his voting preference after the UUP candidates to the SDLP, although he said he would not tell UUP voters what to do with their later preferences. Other UUP candidates opposed the action, saying they will give later preferences to other unionist candidates over the SDLP, and one UUP councillor resigned from the party in protest.

The DUP criticised Nesbitt's position and campaigned arguing that splitting the unionist vote could help Sinn Féin come out as the largest party.

Brexit was also an issue. In the UK-wide referendum on EU membership on 23 June 2016, 56% of voters in Northern Ireland voted to "Remain" a member of the European Union while 44% voted to "Leave". The DUP supported the UK leaving the EU, while nationalist parties and most others opposed, fearing among other things the possibility of a hard border resulting with the Republic of Ireland. It became known during the campaign that the DUP spent £282,000 on a pro-Brexit advert in a newspaper that did not appear in Northern Ireland. The money came from the Constitutional Research Council, a minor pro-union group chaired by the former vice-chair of the Scottish Conservative Party Richard Cook.

The Alliance Party campaigned on their opposition to sectarianism. People Before Profit focused on their opposition to austerity.

Opinion polling

Graphical summary

* (U): Unionist, (N): Nationalist, (O): Other

Results

Overall results

Seat changes compared to a notional result from 2016 with a 90-seat Assembly
Psephologist Nicholas Whyte estimated the likely result in the 2016 election had it been fought with 5-seat constituencies rather than six-seat constituencies. This table shows the different result, and compares the actual result in 2017 to this notional result.

Distribution of seats by constituency

Party affiliation of the five Assembly members returned by each constituency. The first column indicates the party of the Member of the House of Commons (MP) returned by the corresponding parliamentary constituency in the general election of 7 May 2015 (under the "first past the post" method).

 Three of the four independents elected in 1998 ran as Independent Unionists
  NIWC = Northern Ireland Women's Coalition; Prog. U. = Progressive Unionist Party; TUV = Traditional Unionist Voice; UKUP = UK Unionist Party

Share of first-preference votes

Percentage of each constituency's first-preference votes. Four highest percentages in each constituency shaded; absolute majorities underlined. The constituencies are arranged in the geographic order described for the table above; click the icon next to "Constituency" to see them in alphabetical order.

The totals given here are the sum of all valid ballots cast in each constituency, and the percentages are based on such totals. The turnout percentages in the last column, however, are based upon all ballots cast, which also include anything from twenty to a thousand invalid ballots in each constituency. The total valid ballots' percentage of the eligible electorate can correspondingly differ by 0.1% to 2% from the turnout percentage.
 

 Independent Unionist vote in 1998 (2.8%) included in the Independent column (not "others"). TUV = Traditional Unionist Voice.

Incumbents defeated

Aftermath
The election marked a significant shift in Northern Ireland's politics, being the first election since Ireland's partition in 1921 in which unionist parties did not win a majority of seats, and the first time that unionist and nationalist parties received equal representation in the Assembly (39 members between Sinn Féin and the SDLP, 39 members between the DUP, UUP, and TUV). However, a plurality of MLAs were unionists, as Independent MLA Claire Sugden designates as such, leaving 40 unionist MLAs and 39 nationalist MLAs. The DUP's loss of seats also prevented it from unilaterally using the petition of concern mechanism, which the party had controversially used to block measures such as the introduction of same-sex marriage to Northern Ireland.

UUP leader Mike Nesbitt announced his resignation, following the party's failure to make any breakthrough.

Sinn Féin reiterated that it would not return to a power-sharing arrangement with the DUP without significant changes in the DUP's approach, including Foster not becoming First Minister until the RHI investigation is complete. The parties had three weeks to form an administration; failing that, new elections would likely be called.

While unionism lost its overall majority in the Assembly, the result was characterised by political analyst Matthew Whiting as being more about voters seeking competent local leadership, and about the DUP having less success than Sinn Féin in motivating its traditional voter base to turn out, than about a significant move towards a united Ireland.

Secretary of State for Northern Ireland James Brokenshire gave the political parties more time to reach a coalition agreement after the 27 March deadline passed. Sinn Féin called for fresh elections if agreement could not be reached. Negotiations were paused over Easter, but Brokenshire threatened a new election or direct rule if no agreement could be reached by early May. On 18 April, the Conservative Party Prime Minister, Theresa May, then called a snap general election for 8 June 2017. A new deadline of 29 June was then set for power-sharing talks.

The 2017 UK general election saw both the DUP and Sinn Féin advance, with the UUP and SDLP losing all their MPs. The overall result saw the Conservatives losing seats, resulting in a hung parliament. May sought to continue as Prime Minister running a minority administration through seeking the support of the DUP. Various commentators suggested this raised problems for the UK government's role as a neutral arbiter in Northern Ireland, as is required under the Good Friday Agreement. Talks restarted on 12 June 2017, while a Conservative–DUP agreement was announced and published on 26 June.

A new deadline was set for 29 June, but it appeared that no agreement would be reached in time, with the main sticking point over Sinn Féin's desire for an Irish Language Act, rejected by the DUP, while Sinn Féin rejected a hybrid act that also covers Ulster Scots. The deadline passed with no resolution. Brokenshire extended the time for talks, but Sinn Féin and the DUP remained pessimistic about any quick resolution.

Negotiations resumed in the autumn but failed, leaving it in the hands of the UK Parliament to pass a budget for the ongoing financial year of 2017–18. The bill, which began its passage on 13 November, would if enacted release the final 5% of Northern Ireland's block grant. Talks between the DUP and Sinn Féin recommenced on 6 February 2018, only days before the mid-February deadline where, in the absence of an agreement, a regional budget would have to be imposed by Westminster. Despite being attended by Theresa May and Leo Varadkar, the talks collapsed and DUP negotiator Simon Hamilton stated "significant and serious gaps remain between ourselves and Sinn Féin". The stalemate continued into September, at which point Northern Ireland reached 590 days without a fully functioning administration, eclipsing the record set in Belgium between April 2010 and December 2011.

On 18 October the Northern Ireland Secretary Karen Bradley introduced the Northern Ireland (Executive Formation and Exercise of Functions) Bill, removing the time frame of an Assembly election until 26 March 2019, which could be replaced by a later date by the Northern Ireland Secretary for once only, and during which the Northern Ireland Executive could be formed at any time, enabling civil servants to take a certain degree of departmental decisions that would be in public interest, and also allowing Ministers of the Crown to have several Northern Ireland appointments. The Bill's third reading was passed in the House of Commons and in the House of Lords on 24 and 30 October respectively. The Bill became the Northern Ireland (Executive Formation and Exercise of Functions) Act 2018 and came into effect after it received Royal Assent and was passed on 1 November.

During a question period to the Northern Ireland Secretary on 31 October, Karen Bradley announced that she would hold a meeting in Belfast the following day with the main parties regarding the implementation of the Bill (which was not an Act yet on that day) and next steps towards the restoration of the devolution and that she would fly to Dublin alongside Theresa May's de facto deputy David Lidington to hold an inter-governmental conference with the Irish Government. No deal was reached at that time.

On 24 July 2019, the Northern Ireland (Executive Formation etc) Act 2019 further extended the deadline for formation of an executive to 13 January 2020. It also introduced measures requiring the Secretary of State to liberalize abortion law and provisionally legalize same-sex marriage. (Both marriage and health are devolved matters, but legislating on these contentious issues was hampered by the lack of a functioning legislature. In relation to abortion, Westminster had a responsibility to act as NI law had been ruled by the European Court of Human Rights to be in breach of human rights, which are a reserved matter.) Unionist MPs attempted to reconvene the Assembly on 21 October to pass legislation to defeat the measures, but no business could be conducted due to a boycott by Sinn Féin. The Act additionally formed part of the 2019 prorogation controversy by requiring the Secretary of State to make regular reports to Parliament, thus preventing prorogation.

In early January 2020, the British and Irish governments announced the text of a deal to restore power sharing in Northern Ireland, and to restore devolution. The Northern Ireland Executive was finally restored on 11 January 2020, with Foster returning as First Minister and Michelle O'Neill of Sinn Féin as deputy First Minister.

Footnotes

See also
 History of Northern Ireland
 History of the United Kingdom
 2020 in the United Kingdom
 2020 in politics and government

References

External links
Manifestos
 Alliance
 DUP
 Green (NI)
 Northern Ireland Conservatives
 People Before Profit Alliance
 SDLP
 Sinn Féin
 Traditional Unionist Voice
 UKIP
 UUP
 Workers' Party of Northern Ireland

2017 elections in the United Kingdom
2017
March 2017 events in the United Kingdom
2017 elections in Northern Ireland